Johannes Hadlaub (fl. 1300, d. before 1340) is one of the Minnesingers whose works are recorded in Codex Manesse. He was a citizen of Zürich, and is on record as buying a house there in 1302.

There are 51 songs by Hadlaub in the Codex Manesse, and it is commonly assumed that Hadlaub was actively involved in its compilation. 
This assumption was fictionalised in  a poetic novella, "Hadlaub" (in the Züricher Novellen, 1878), by Gottfried Keller.

References 

 Iwan Adelbert Schleicher: Über Meister Johannes Hadlaubs Leben und Gedichte, 1888
 Rudolf Sillib: Auf den Spuren Johannes Hadlaubs,  1922
 Hedwig Lang: Johannes Hadlaub, 1959
 Max Schiendorfer (Hrsg.): Johannes Hadlaub. Die Gedichte des Zürcher Minnesängers, 1986, 
 Rena Leppin: Johannes Hadlaub. Lieder und Leichs,  1995, 
 Ursel Fischer: Meister Johans Hadloub. Autorbild und Werkkonzeption der Manessischen Liederhandschrift,1996,

External links 
online facsimile

13th-century births
14th-century deaths
14th-century Swiss people
Minnesingers
People from Zürich
14th-century German poets
German classical composers
German male classical composers
Swiss classical composers
Swiss male classical composers